Alice Isaaz (born 26 July 1991) is a French actress. She is known for her roles in the films The Gilded Cage (2013), La Crème de la crème (2014) and Les Yeux jaunes des crocodiles (2014).

Filmography

References

External links

 
Lola Le Lann & Alice Isaaz - Interview

1991 births
Living people
French film actresses
French television actresses
21st-century French actresses
Actresses from Bordeaux